Albert Ivanov (7 September 1931 – 5 April 2000) was a Soviet long-distance runner. He competed in the marathon at the 1956 Summer Olympics.

References

1931 births
2000 deaths
Athletes (track and field) at the 1956 Summer Olympics
Soviet male long-distance runners
Soviet male marathon runners
Olympic athletes of the Soviet Union
People from Tapa, Estonia